Sundown Mounds is an multimound  archaeological site in Tensas Parish, Louisiana from the Early Coles Creek culture.
It is the type site for the Sundown Phase (600-800 CE) of the Tensas Basin and Natchez Bluff Coles Creek chronology.

Description
The site is located on the western bank of Little Choctaw Bayou and has three platform mounds that form a triangle surrounding a plaza, a typical Coles Creek arrangement. Mounds A and B had ramps from their summits down to the plaza. The mounds were constructed sometime between 750 and 800 CE, but the site was occupied during most of the Coles Creek period  from 700 to 1200.

See also
Culture, phase, and chronological table for the Mississippi Valley
Balmoral Mounds
Flowery Mound
Ghost Site Mounds

References

External links
 Sundown Mounds: Ancient Mounds Trail - Louisiana Historical Markers on Waymarking.com

Archaeological sites of the Coles Creek culture
Mounds in Louisiana
Geography of Tensas Parish, Louisiana
7th-century establishments in Coles Creek culture
12th-century disestablishments in Coles Creek culture
Former Native American populated places in the United States